Brigadier-General Henry Berkeley (after 1682 – 23 May 1736) was a British Army officer and politician who sat in the House of Commons from 1720 to 1734.

Berkeley was the third son of Charles Berkeley, 2nd Earl of Berkeley and his wife Elizabeth Noel, daughter of Baptist Noel, 3rd Viscount Campden. He served as a page of honour to the Duke of Gloucester, and afterwards to Queen Anne. He obtained a commission in the Army in December 1709, rising to be a Brigadier-General in the Horse Grenadier Guards in 1735. He married, in 1712, Mary Cornewall,  daughter of Col. Henry Cornewall, MP of Moccas, Herefordshire'

In June 1717 Berkeley was appointed first commissioner for executing the office of Master of the Horse to King George I, and on 25 December following he was appointed to the colonelcy of the King's Own Regiment of Foot, from which he was removed in 1719 to the Scots Troop of Horse Grenadier Guards, a position he held until his death. He was also one of the King's equerries.

Berkeley was returned unopposed as a Whig Member of Parliament for Gloucestershire at a by-election on 30 March 1720. He was re-elected in a contest at the 1722 general election and returned unopposed at the  1727 general election. All his recorded votes were for the Government. He did not stand in the 1734 general election.

Berkeley died at Bath on 23 May 1736. He and his wife had two sons and three daughters.

References

 Richard Cannon, Historical Record of the Fourth, or the King's Own Regiment of Foot (1839) p. 147.
 Shirley Matthews, BERKELEY, Hon. Henry (aft.1682-1736), of Berkeley Castle, Glos. in The History of Parliament: the House of Commons 1715-1754 (1970).

1680s births
Year of birth unknown
1736 deaths
Younger sons of earls
British Army brigadiers
British MPs 1715–1722
British MPs 1722–1727
British MPs 1727–1734
Members of the Parliament of Great Britain for English constituencies
South Wales Borderers officers
Scots Guards officers
King's Own Royal Regiment officers
British Life Guards officers
Henry